Lazar Đorđević (also transliterated Lazar Djordjević; born 14 July 1992) is a Serbian football player who plays for Al-Khaldiya SC in the Bahraini Premier League.

Career

MFK Košice
Born in Vranje, Lazar Đorđević joined MFK Košice in summer 2013. On 14 September 2013, he made his debut for MFK Košice, playing thirty-one minutes in a 4–1 home win against FK DAC 1904 Dunajská Streda.

Vojvodina
On 4 July 2018, Đorđević signed a two-year-deal with Vojvodina. On 18 December 2018 Đorđević and Vojvodina reached an agreement to mutually terminate the contract.

MFK Karviná
On 3 January 2019, Đorđević joined Czech club MFK Karviná. However, the deal was first completed on 29 January 2019.

Zira FK
On 29 July 2020, Đorđević signed a two-year contract with Zira FK.

References

External links
 
 
  
 Corgoň Liga profile

1992 births
Living people
Serbian footballers
Association football defenders
FK Sileks players
FC VSS Košice players
FK Železiarne Podbrezová players
FK Vojvodina players
MFK Karviná players
FK Radnički Niš players
Zira FK players
Macedonian First Football League players
Serbian SuperLiga players
Slovak Super Liga players
Czech First League players
Azerbaijan Premier League players
Serbian expatriate footballers
Expatriate footballers in North Macedonia
Expatriate footballers in Slovakia
Expatriate footballers in the Czech Republic
Expatriate footballers in Azerbaijan
Serbian expatriate sportspeople in the Czech Republic
Serbian expatriate sportspeople in Slovakia
Serbian expatriate sportspeople in North Macedonia
Serbian expatriate sportspeople in Azerbaijan]
People from Vranje